Ceppellini is an Italian family name. The name may refer to:

Pablo Ceppelini (born 1991), Uruguayan football player
Primo Ceppellini (born 1963), Italian businessman and writer
Ruggero Ceppellini (1917–1988), Italian geneticist

References

Italian-language surnames